Li Ping (born 18 May 1986) is a Chinese-Qatari table tennis player. With Cao Zhen, he won the gold medal in the mixed doubles event of the 2009 World Table Tennis Championships, representing China.

He represented Qatar at the 2016 Summer Olympics, losing 3:4 to Dimitrij Ovtcharov in the third round. He also won the ITTF World Tour Belarus Open in 2015.

References

Chinese male table tennis players
Qatari male table tennis players
Naturalised citizens of Qatar
Qatari people of Chinese descent
Chinese emigrants to Qatar
Living people
1986 births
Table tennis players at the 2016 Summer Olympics
Olympic table tennis players of Qatar
Expatriate sportspeople in Qatar
Table tennis players from Tianjin
Naturalised table tennis players
Qatari expatriate sportspeople in Japan
Chinese expatriate sportspeople in Japan
Ryukyu Asteeda players
Expatriate table tennis people in Japan